Two-stage presidential elections were held in South Korea in February 1981. An electoral college was elected on 11 February, which in turn elected the president on 25 February. They were the last indirect presidential elections controlled by the government of Chun Doo-hwan under the new 1980 constitution. Chun was re-elected with 90% of the electoral college vote.

Background
Rising to prominence as the leader of the military after the assassination of former military dictator of South Korea Park Chung-hee, Security Commander Chun Doo-hwan successfully forced Park's successor Choi Kyu-hah to step down from the presidency and became president himself through the indirect elections of 1980.

He then revised the Constitution on 27 October 1980. The revised constitution was slightly less authoritarian than its predecessor. Among other things, it changed the presidential election system. Although it was still an indirect election by the electoral college, opposition candidates were now allowed to enter. However, this had no effect on the political landscape. Chun had jailed most prominent opposition politicians, including former NDP chairman Kim Young-sam, 1971 NDP presidential nominee Kim Dae-jung, and former prime minister Kim Jong-pil.

Presidential nominations
The Democratic Justice Party (DJP) National Convention was held on 15 January at Jamsil Gymnasium in Seoul. At the convention, 3,162 delegates from around the nation nominated the sitting President Chun Doo-hwan without a vote.

The Democratic Korea Party (DKP) National Convention was held on 17 January at the Sejong Center for Performing Arts in Seoul. Yu Chi-song, a former 3-term lawmaker from Gyeonggi, was nominated as the party's candidate for president.

The Korea Nationalist Party (KNP) National Convention was held on 23 January at the Sejong Center for Performing Arts, and saw Kim Chong-cheol, a former five-term lawmaker from South Chungcheong, nominated.

The Civil Rights Party National Convention was held on 23 January at the Cheondo Hall; Kim Eui-taek, a former four-term lawmaker from South Jeolla was chosen as the party's candidate.

Other political parties including the Democratic Socialist Party, the Socialist Party and the New Politics Party announced they would not be participating in the elections as they were not capable of finding viable candidates for president or the electoral college.

Electoral College nominations

Electoral College election
According to official figures, 78.1% of registered voters voted, and gave Chun's DJP a supermajority of 3,667 seats in the electoral college, 69.5 percent of the total. The DJP won three times as many seats as independent candidates, and nine times as many seats as the largest opposition party, the Democratic Korea Party.

By region

Electoral College vote
In order to be elected, a candidate had to receive the vote of over 50% of the incumbent members of the Electoral College. Of the 5,277 electors who were elected on 11 February and had not been removed from office (one member was removed in Busan), this meant 2,639 votes were needed to win. Sitting president Chun Doo-hwan was re-elected by a landslide on 25 February with 4,755 votes, 90.11% of the total possible. However, the DJP's supermajority in the electoral college meant Chun's election was all but assured.

By region

Aftermath 
The term of the newly elected president officially began on the day the electoral votes were cast and counted, 25 February. The inauguration ceremony took place on 3 March. This marked the official beginning of the Fifth Republic of Korea, a dictatorial regime that lasted until democratization in 1988.

Notes

References

Presidential elections in South Korea
South Korea
President